Johanna Charlotte Wessels (born 13 May 1987) is a Dutch singer-songwriter and multi-instrumentalist. She is best known as the former lead vocalist for the Dutch symphonic metal band Delain.

Background
Wessels has been trained in both jazz singing and classical singing. She was first trained in jazz, but later, her instructor suggested classical singing to her. However, Wessels has stated that she found classical training to be very restrictive, and so she likes to do something "in between the classical and the jazz stuff, and if you look at classical music with high vocal lines, then you kind of get to gothic very soon!"

Career

To Elysium (2000–2005)
She joined a gothic metal band named To Elysium around the age of fifteen or sixteen. She mentions in an interview that her parents had to sign a contract because she was still underage.

Delain (2004–2021)

Wessels became involved with Delain in 2004 when she met Martijn Westerholt formerly of Within Temptation. Since the band was meant to be a studio project only, Westerholt asked if she could write some lyrics and vocalize. She thought it was going to be a one-time thing. In 2005 they signed a deal with Roadrunner Records. She was the lead vocalist and primary lyricist of the band.

She departed the band in February 2021, with Delain reforming as a solo musical project of Martijn Westerholt as well as announcing that she would be launching a solo career. In Wessels' statement on her departure, she wished the other departing members and the fans well: 

In May 2021 during an interview, she reflected on her departure from Delain in February, stating that she was grateful that she got to work with the other musicians in the band.

Phantasma (2015–2017)
Wessels, along with Georg Neuhauser from Serenity and Oliver Philipps from Everon, formed a symphonic rock group named Phantasma. They were signed to Napalm Records and released a concept album titled The Deviant Hearts. Wessels not only sings on the album, but also wrote her debut novella called The Deviant Hearts especially for it. The novella is included with the album's physical release.

Solo career (2020–present)
In August 2020, Wessels released the single, "Lizzie" which features Alissa White-Gluz as part of a collaboration.

Following her departure from Delain, Wessels had released a solo single, "Soft Revolution" via her Patreon which was Song of the Month in January 2021. On 14 May 2021, Wessels released a cover of Gerard McMahon's "Cry Little Sister", a song featured in the 1987 film The Lost Boys. On 30 June 2021, she released a music video of the single, "Superhuman".

On 1 June 2021, Wessels announced the title of her first studio album, Tales from Six Feet Under, a collection of multiple genres ranging from indie pop to synth-infused rock. It was released on 17 September 2021. All of the songs were made in her home studio, where she wrote, produced, and performed all the instruments on the record.

Following the release of her solo album, she released her new song "Tonight" on 25 November 2021.

On 28 June 2022, Wessels announced her second studio album, titled Tales from Six Feet Under, Vol. II, which was released on 7 October 2022.

Wessels also appeared on the EP The Alchemy Project by the Dutch symphonic metal band Epica, on the song "Sirens – Of Blood and Water", alongside Amalie Bruun. A music video for this song was released on 11 November 2022.

Influences

When asked in 2014 who her influences are, Wessels said

When asked in a Loudwire interview who she gets inspired by vocally she mentions Australian singer Sia, she admires Sia's voice and also her songwriting.

On 15 January 2018, Charlotte Wessels said on her Instagram that Dolores O'Riordan's voice was one of her main inspirations to start singing.

Personal life
She is a cousin of Dutch hardcore DJ DaY-már.  Wessels has an art history degree and also has a master's degree in gender studies. She is a vegan. She considers herself a feminist and she doesn't like the female-fronted metal term:  "It's just really weird that the gender of one person in the band defines what kind of music you make! I think that it's one of the things that really indicates that the bias is still there."

On August 26, 2017, Charlotte revealed that she married her partner of twelve years.

Discography

Solo
Studio albums
 Tales from Six Feet Under (2021)
 Tales from Six Feet Under, Vol. II (2022)

Delain
Studio albums
 Lucidity (2006)
 April Rain (2009)
 We Are the Others (2012)
 The Human Contradiction (2014)
 Moonbathers (2016)
 Apocalypse & Chill (2020)

EPs & Live albums
 Lunar Prelude (2016)
 A Decade of Delain: Live at Paradiso (2017)
 Hunter's Moon (2019)

Phantasma
Studio albums
 The Deviant Hearts (2015)

Filmography 
 Soaring Highs and Brutal Lows: The Voices of Women in Metal (2015)

References

Sources

External links

 Charlotte Wessels Official Blog
 Charlotte Wessels on Delain's website
 Delain's Official Page

1987 births
Dutch heavy metal singers
Dutch singer-songwriters
Feminist artists
Feminist musicians
Women heavy metal singers
Living people
People from Zwolle
21st-century Dutch singers
21st-century Dutch women singers
Delain members